Henry John McPherson (18 October 1902 – 2 June 1968) was an Australian rules footballer who played with Carlton and St Kilda in the Victorian Football League (VFL).

Notes

External links 

Harry McPherson's playing statistics from The VFA Project
Harry McPherson's profile at Blueseum

1902 births
Carlton Football Club players
St Kilda Football Club players
Prahran Football Club players
Australian rules footballers from Victoria (Australia)
1968 deaths